Rhein-Flugzeugbau GmbH (RFB) was a German aircraft manufacturer. The company was established at Krefeld, Germany in 1955, and later moved to Mönchengladbach.

Aircraft
1955 Rhein Flugzeugbau RW 3 Multoplan
1960 Rhein-Flugzeugbau RF-1
1970 RFB X-113
1973 RFB/Grumman American Fanliner
1977 RFB X-114 - ground effect vehicle
1982 RFB Fantrainer - basic two seat ducted-fan-powered trainer

References

External links

Companies based in North Rhine-Westphalia
Defunct aircraft manufacturers of Germany